Artia may refer to:
Artia, Virginia
Artia (plant), a genus of Apocynaceae
Artia (publisher), a Czech publisher